Kirkby (historically known as Kirkby-in-Cleveland) is a village and civil parish in Hambleton district of North Yorkshire, England, near Great Busby and  south of Stokesley. The village is mentioned in the Domesday Book as belonging to Uhtred. The name of the village derives from the Old Norse kirkju-býr, which means church with a village. At the 2001 Census, the population of the village was recorded at 313, dropping slightly to 309 at the 2011 Census. In 2015, North Yorkshire County Council estimated the population to be 310.

The A172 road is to the north and the B1257 Stokesley to Helmsley road is in the village of Great Broughton,  to the east.

The parish church of St Augustine was built in 1815 to replace a medieval building. The chancel was rebuilt in the early 1900s by London architect Temple Moore. It is a grade II* listed building. Besides the church, Kirkby also has a village hall and a public house, the Black Swan.

To the south of the village is Kirby Bank (without a second 'K'). Part of the pathway there is a Medieval greenway known as the Kirby Bank Trod, which is believed to have been laid in the 12th century as part of the route to Rievaulx Abbey. The track is a scheduled ancient monument.

References

External links

Villages in North Yorkshire
Civil parishes in North Yorkshire